The duck test is a form of abductive reasoning, usually expressed as "If it looks like a duck, swims like a duck, and quacks like a duck, then it probably is a duck."

The test implies that a person can identify an unknown subject by observing that subject's habitual characteristics. It is sometimes used to counter abstruse arguments that something is not what it appears to be.

History 

The French automaton maker Jacques de Vaucanson created a mechanical duck in 1738. The mechanical duck would quack, move its head to eat grain which it would appear to digest, and after a short time would excrete a mixture that looked and smelled like duck droppings. The irony is that while the phrase is often cited as proof of abductive reasoning, it is not proof, as the mechanical duck is still not a living duck.

In popular culture 
Douglas Adams parodied this test in his book Dirk Gently's Holistic Detective Agency:

Monty Python also referenced the test in the Witch Logic scene in their 1975 film Monty Python and the Holy Grail, where Sir Bedevere reasons that if ducks float and wood burns, then a person who weighs the same as a duck is made of wood and should be burned as a witch.

The Liskov Substitution Principle in computer science is sometimes expressed as a counter-example to the duck test:

Vladimir Vapnik, co-inventor of the support-vector machine and a major contributor to the theory of machine learning, uses the duck test as a way to summarize the importance of simple predicates to classify things. During the discussion he often uses the test to illustrate that the concise format of the duck test is a form of intelligence that machines are not capable of producing.

The philosopher Slavoj Žižek has cited the Marx Brothers' rewording of the duck test: "He may look like an idiot and talk like an idiot, but don't let that fool you. He really is an idiot." The humor of this line lies in its violation of an expected opposite.

Political applications
A common variation of the wording of the phrase may have originated much later with Emil Mazey, secretary-treasurer of the United Auto Workers, at a labor meeting in 1946 accusing a person of being a Communist:

The term was later popularized in the United States by Richard Cunningham Patterson Jr., United States ambassador to Guatemala in 1950 during the Cold War, who used the phrase when he accused Guatemala's Jacobo Arbenz Guzmán government of being Communist. Patterson explained his reasoning as follows:

Later references to the duck test include Cardinal Richard Cushing's, who used the phrase in 1964 in reference to Fidel Castro.
In 2015, a variation of the duck test was applied in the revocation of tax-exempt nonprofit status to Blue Shield of California:

Also in 2015, Russian Minister of Foreign Affairs Sergey Lavrov used a version of the test in response to allegations that Russian airstrikes in Syria were not targeting terrorist groups, primarily ISIS, but rather Western-supported groups such as the Free Syrian Army. When asked to elaborate his definition of "terrorist groups", he replied:

In 2021, a version of the test was used by Singapore's Minister of Finance Lawrence Wong in response to claims by members of the Progress Singapore Party that their parliamentary motion on free trade agreements was not racist. He said:

Elephant test

Similarly, the term elephant test refers to situations in which an idea or thing, "is hard to describe, but instantly recognizable when spotted".

The term is often used in legal cases when there is an issue which may be open to interpretation, such as in the case of Cadogan Estates Ltd v Morris, when Lord Justice Stuart-Smith referred  to "...the well-known elephant test. It is difficult to describe, but you know it when you see it", and in Ivey v Genting Casinos, when Lord Hughes (in discussing dishonesty) opined "...like the elephant, it is characterised more by recognition when encountered than by definition."  This decision partially overruled R v Ghosh.

A similar incantation (used however as a rule of exclusion) was invoked by the concurring opinion of Justice Potter Stewart in Jacobellis v. Ohio, 378 U.S. 184 (1964), an obscenity case.  He stated that the Constitution protected all obscenity except "hard-core pornography". Stewart opined, "I shall not today attempt further to define the kinds of material I understand to be embraced within that shorthand description; and perhaps I could never succeed in intelligibly doing so. But I know it when I see it, and the motion picture involved in this case is not that."

See also 
 
 
 
 
 
 
 
 
 
 
 
 
 WP:DUCK, a Wikipedia page specifically related to the duck test

References

English-language idioms
Epistemology
Razors (philosophy)
Heuristics
Metaphors referring to birds
Articles containing video clips